Alzheimer Disease and Associated Disorders is a quarterly peer-reviewed medical journal publishing original research findings and new approaches to diagnosis and treatment for Alzheimer's disease and related disorders. Articles published emphasize research in humans including epidemiologic studies, clinical trials and experimental studies, studies of diagnosis and biomarkers, as well as research on health effects of people with dementia.

References

External links 
 

Quarterly journals
Publications established in 1987
English-language journals
Lippincott Williams & Wilkins academic journals
Alzheimer's disease journals